Charles Almon Dewey (September 11, 1877 – March 2, 1958) was a United States district judge of the United States District Court for the Southern District of Iowa.

Education and career

Born in Washington, Iowa, Dewey attended Oberlin College in Ohio. He was a Corporal in the United States Volunteers during the Spanish–American War. In 1901, he received a Bachelor of Laws from the University of Iowa College of Law, and entered private practice in Washington, Iowa. He was city attorney of Washington from 1905 to 1909, and county attorney for Washington County, Iowa from 1909 to 1915. From 1918 to 1928, he served as a state district court judge in Iowa's sixth judicial district.

Federal judicial service

In 1927, a backlog of unresolved cases had developed in the United States District Court for the Southern District of Iowa. On January 19, 1928, President Calvin Coolidge signed into law a bill that authorized the appointment of a second judge to the Southern District of Iowa, with the proviso that when the existing judgeship becomes vacant, it shall not be filled unless authorized by Congress.

Dewey was nominated by President Calvin Coolidge on January 23, 1928, to the United States District Court for the Southern District of Iowa, to a new seat authorized by 45 Stat. 52. He was confirmed by the United States Senate on January 31, 1928, and received his commission the same day. He assumed senior status on March 1, 1949. As a senior judge, he was given temporary assignments three times, sitting by designation in St. Louis, Missouri, New York City, New York and Miami, Florida. His service terminated on March 2, 1958, due to his death in Des Moines, Iowa.

References

External links
 The Charles A. Dewey Papers are housed at the University of Iowa Special Collections & University Archives.
 

1877 births
1958 deaths
Iowa state court judges
Judges of the United States District Court for the Southern District of Iowa
United States district court judges appointed by Calvin Coolidge
20th-century American judges
United States Army soldiers
People from Washington, Iowa